Leominster was a parliamentary constituency represented until 1707 in the  House of Commons of England, then until 1801 in that of Great Britain, and finally until 2010, when it disappeared in boundary changes, in the Parliament of the United Kingdom.

From 1295 to 1885, Leominster was a parliamentary borough which until 1868 elected two Members of Parliament by the bloc vote system of election.  Under the Reform Act 1867 its representation was reduced to one Member, elected by the first past the post system.  The parliamentary borough was abolished under the Redistribution of Seats Act 1885, and the name was transferred to a new county constituency.

History

Abolition
Following the review by the Boundary Commission for England of parliamentary representation in Herefordshire, no longer connected for such reasons with Worcestershire, two parliamentary constituencies have been allocated to the county.  Most of the Leominster seat has been replaced by the North Herefordshire seat, while the remainder of the county is covered by the Hereford and South Herefordshire seat.

Boundaries
1885–1918: The Municipal Borough of Leominster, and the Sessional Divisions of Bredwardine, Bromyard, Kingston, Leominster, Weobley, and Wigmore.

1918–1950: The Municipal Borough of Leominster, the Urban Districts of Bromyard and Kington, the Rural Districts of Bredwardine, Bromyard, Kington, Leominster, Weobley, and Wigmore, and parts of the Rural Districts of Hereford and Ledbury.

1950–1974: The Municipal Borough of Leominster, the Urban Districts of Bromyard, Kington, and Ledbury, the Rural Districts of Bromyard, Kington, Ledbury, Leominster, and Weobley and Wigmore, and part of the Rural District of Hereford.

1974–1983: The Municipal Borough of Leominster, the Urban District of Kington, the Rural Districts of Bromyard, Kington, Ledbury, Leominster, and Weobley and Wigmore, and part of the Rural District of Hereford.

1983–1997: The District of Leominster, the District of Malvern Hills wards of Baldwin, Bringsty, Broadheath, Bromyard, Butterley, Cradley, Frome, Frome Vale, Hallow, Hegdon, Hope End, Laugherne Hill, Leadon Vale, Ledbury, Leigh and Bransford, Marcle Ridge, Martley, Temeside, and Woodbury, and the District of South Herefordshire wards of Burghill, Burmarsh, Dinmore Hill, Hagley, Magna, Munstone, Swainshill, and Thinghill.

1997–2010: The District of Leominster, the District of Malvern Hills wards of Bringsty, Bromyard, Butterley, Cradley, Frome, Frome Vale, Hegdon, Hope End, Leadon Vale, Ledbury, and Marcle Ridge, the District of South Herefordshire wards of Backbury, Burghill, Burmarsh, Credenhill, Dinmore Hill, Hagley, Munstone, Swainshill, and Thinghill, and the District of Wyre Forest ward of Rock and Ribbesford.

In its final form, the constituency consisted of northern Herefordshire and a small part of north-west Worcestershire, the boundaries having been specified when the two were joined as the single county of Hereford and Worcester.  In Herefordshire it included the towns of Bromyard, Kington and Ledbury as well as Leominster, while the largest settlement of Worcestershire it included was Tenbury Wells.

Members of Parliament

Leominster parliamentary borough

To 1660

Members 1660-1868 (two)

Members 1868–1885 (one)

Leominster county constituency

Members 1885–2010

Elections

Elections in the 1830s
Stephenson was declared bankrupt and unseated, causing a by-election.

Brayen resigned, causing a by-election.

Elections in the 1840s

Wigram resigned after being appointed as a Vice-Chancellor, causing a by-election.

Greenaway resigned by accepting the office of Steward of the Chiltern Hundreds, causing a by-election.

Barkly resigned after being appointed Governor of British Guiana, causing a by-election.

Elections in the 1850s

 

Arkwright's death caused a by-election.

 

Willoughby resigned after being appointed as a Member of the Council of India, causing a by-election.

Elections in the 1860s

Hardy was also elected MP for Oxford University and opted to sit there, causing a by-election.

Walsh resigned in order to contest a by-election in Radnorshire, causing a by-election.

Seat reduced to one member

Elections in the 1870s

Arkwright resigned, causing a by-election.

Elections in the 1880s

Elections in the 1890s

Elections in the 1900s

Elections in the 1910s

 Some records describe Lamb as an Independent Radical.
 Langford was also a Liberal.

Elections in the 1920s

Elections in the 1930s

Elections in the 1940s 
General Election 1939–40

Another General Election was required to take place before the end of 1940. The political parties had been making preparations for an election to take place from 1939 and by the end of this year, the following candidates had been selected;  
Conservative: Ernest Shepperson
Liberal: Albert Edward Farr

Elections in the 1950s

Elections in the 1960s

Elections in the 1970s

Elections in the 1980s

Elections in the 1990s

Elections in the 2000s

See also
List of parliamentary constituencies in Herefordshire and Worcestershire

References
Craig, F. W. S. (1983). British parliamentary election results 1918-1949 (3 ed.). Chichester: Parliamentary Research Services. .

Leominster
Parliamentary constituencies in Herefordshire (historic)
Constituencies of the Parliament of the United Kingdom established in 1295
Constituencies of the Parliament of the United Kingdom disestablished in 2010